Tuoba Liwei was the first leader of the Tuoba clan of the Xianbei people, in 219–277. He was the ancestor of the future Northern Wei Dynasty and was thus posthumously honored as Emperor Shenyuan, with the temple name Shizu. Later, Emperor Wen of Western Wei changed his temple name to Taizu.

Family
Tuoba Shamohan (拓跋沙漠汗)
Tuoba Xilu (拓跋悉鹿/拓跋悉禄)
Tuoba Chuo (拓跋绰)
Tuoba Luguan (拓跋禄官)

277 deaths
Chieftains of the Tuoba clan